Nanniwan is a town in Baota District, Yan'an, Shaanxi, China. The town is a significant site for red tourism in China.

History 
In 1941, the 359th Brigade of the Eighth Route Army arrived in Nanniwan, and established themselves in the town. While stationed in Nanniwan, the brigade created farms, herded livestock, and created an artillery training school.

In 1972, the Nanniwan People's Commune was established. In 1984, the people's commune was abolished, and Nanniwan became a town.

In 2011,  was merged into Nanniwan.

Administrative divisions 
Nanniwan governs the following residential community and 12 administrative villages:

 Nanniwan Community
 Panlong Village
 Taobaoyu Village
 Nanyangfu Village
 Mafang Village
 Nanniwan Village
 Santaizhuang Village
 Chenzigou Village
 Songshulin Village
 Mizhuang Village
 Dengtun Village
 Jiulongquan Village
 Maping Village

Demographics 
As of 2018, Nanniwan has a hukou population of 13,264.

A government report in 2015 reported 15,334 living in Nanniwan.

According to the 2010 Chinese Census, Nanniwan had a population of 4,960. , which was merged into Nanniwan the following year, had a population of 3,138 according to the same census.

According to the 2000 Chinese Census, Nanniwan had a population of 6,518.

A 1996 estimate put Nanniwan's population at about 5,000.

Economy 
Nanniwan is a major site for red tourism in China, with approximately 210,000 tourists visiting the town on May Day, 2021, earning the town 12 million renminbi in tourism revenue. However, Nanniwan remains a rural town with relatively low levels of income. A 2015 government report found that 1,041 people in Nanniwan lived in poverty. In an effort to combat the town's low economic development, and improve its touristic development, the town has worked with Yan'an's regional government to shut down oil wells in the town, and restore wetlands and rice paddies. The town's government has also bought farmland from many farmers in the town, and converted it to tourist facilities and parks.

See also 

 Nanniwan (song)
 Yan'an Nanniwan Airport
 Yan'an Rectification Movement
List of township-level divisions of Shaanxi

References

Baota District
Township-level divisions of Shaanxi
Towns in China